Anthony James Keck (c1740 – 1782) was an English politician who sat in the House of Commons from 1765 to 1780.

Keck was born in Stoughton, Leicestershire, and educated at Eton, St John's College, Cambridge, and Lincoln's Inn.

He was Member of Parliament (MP) for Leicester from 1765 to 1768, also for the rotten borough of Newton in Lancashire from 1768 to 1780. He lived at Stoughton Grange until he moved to Lancashire in 1768 and died aged 42 years, on 28 February 1782. He is buried at St Mary and All Saints Church in Stoughton. along with numerous members of his family and descendants including his son, George Anthony Legh Keck (who was also MP for Leicestershire).

Family
His grandfather was Sir Anthony Keck. His father was also Anthony Keck of Lincoln's Inn and his mother was Anne Busby of Beaumont, daughter of William Busby and Catherine Beaumont his wife. His father was a sergeant-at-law, who worked with Thomas Vernon.
Anthony James Keck, married Elizabeth Legh (the second daughter of Peter Legh of Lyme Park and Martha Bennet of Salthrop House), and by her had six children as follows: 

There are marble plaques in remembrance for all the Keck family in the church of St Mary and All Saints in Stoughton. Elizabeth Legh remarried after the death of Anthony James Keck to William Bathurst Pye-Bennet and inherited the Broad Hinton estate (from the new marriage) and Salthrop estate (from her mother Martha Legh (née Bennet)) as well as the estates belonging to Norborne Family of Bremhill, Wiltshire. The estates then passed to her surviving daughter Elizabeth Calley (née Keck).

References

1740 births
1782 deaths
People educated at Eton College
Alumni of St John's College, Cambridge
People from Stoughton, Leicestershire
Members of the Parliament of Great Britain for English constituencies
British MPs 1761–1768
British MPs 1768–1774
British MPs 1774–1780